A pill organiser (or pill organizer), pill container, dosette box, pillcase or pillbox is a multicompartment compliance aid for storing scheduled doses of medications. Pill organisers usually have square-shaped compartments for each day of the week, although other more compact and discreet versions have come to market, including cylindrical and pen-shaped cases. Some organisers have sections corresponding to times of the day. Pill organisers are viewed as a way to prevent or reduce medication errors on the part of the patient, though evidence of effectiveness is not strong and they have been linked to medication errors.

Usage
Pill organisers are useful for all types of patients, including the elderly, those who have memory deficiencies, and those taking multiple medications as an aid in remembering to take proper doses of their medications in compliance with their doctor's recommended dose. They allow a patient to know whether or not they have taken a particular dose of their medication; if a pill still remains in its compartment, it is apparent that it has not yet been taken, whereas if it is missing, it has already been taken.

Pill organisers often have various features to make them easier for special-needs patients to use, such as color-coding, Braille for the blind, or a locking mechanism to prevent double dosing. Some organisers used for diabetes patients have sections for insulin and hypodermic syringes.

Some pharmacists will pre-load pills into pill organisers for their patients, as a convenient service.

Electronic pill organisers
Electronic pill organisers, pill dispensers, and pill reminders have been developed that alert patients when their prescription medication, OTC medication, or daily food supplements must be taken.  These devices have been credited with saving lives and saving money in the health care system. Advanced models can be linked via the Internet to a medical facility, to aid in monitoring and reminding a patient to take his/her medications.

Legality
In some jurisdictions in the United States possession of prescription drugs in a pill organiser is a crime, and people have been prosecuted for it.  The legal theory is that since the drug is not in the package it was dispensed in by the pharmacy, and since it is not "in use" (e.g., swallowed), it is unlawfully possessed.  The affirmative defence, that the possessor has a valid prescription for the drug in question, is not always accepted by the court.

References

Clinical pharmacology
Dosage forms
Pharmacy
Medicine storage containers